Andrew Malcolm may refer to:
 Andrew Malcolm (politician),  Scottish-born manufacturer and political figure in Ontario
 Andrew Malcolm (author), British author and campaigner
 Andrew George Malcolm Irish physician and medical historian
 Andy Malcolm, English footballer